Buffalo North Breakwater South End Light is a lighthouse formerly located at the entrance to Buffalo Harbor, Buffalo, New York. It is one of two "bottle shaped" beacons located in Buffalo Harbor; the other is the South Buffalo North Side Light. It is distinguished by four cast iron port windows and a curved iron door. It was first lit on September 1, 1903, and originally equipped with a 6th-order Fresnel lens. A battery operated 12 volt lamp with a  green plastic lens was installed in the beacon c. 1960, when a domed roof formerly mounted over the lens was removed. The beacon was removed in 1985, and now stands on the grounds of the Buffalo (main) Light. Its twin is located at the Dunkirk Lighthouse and Veterans Park Museum.

It was listed on the National Register of Historic Places in 1983.

References

Further reading
 Oleszewski, Wes. Great Lakes Lighthouses, American and Canadian: A Comprehensive Directory/Guide to Great Lakes Lighthouses, (Gwinn, Michigan: Avery Color Studios, Inc., 1998) .
 
 U.S. Coast Guard. Historically Famous Lighthouses (Washington, D.C.: Government Printing Office, 1957).
 Wright, Larry and Wright, Patricia. Great Lakes Lighthouses Encyclopedia Hardback (Erin: Boston Mills Press, 2006)

External links

 
 
 Inventory of Historic Light Stations: Significant Unmanned Aids: BUFFALO NORTH BREAKWATER SOUTH END "BOTTLE" LIGHT
 Buffalo North Breakwater South End Light – U.S. National Register of Historic Places on Waymarking.com

Lighthouses completed in 1903
Transportation buildings and structures in Buffalo, New York
Lighthouses on the National Register of Historic Places in New York (state)
National Register of Historic Places in Buffalo, New York
Lighthouses in Erie County, New York